Jay Jay is a 2003 Indian Tamil-language romance film written and directed by Saran. The film stars R. Madhavan, Amogha and Pooja, while Kalabhavan Mani, Charle, Dhamu and Malavika Avinash also play key supporting roles. Produced by V. Ravichandran of Oscar Films, the film had music scored by Bharadwaj. The core plot of the movie is based on the 2001 movie Serendipity.

Plot
Jagan (R. Madhavan) is a carefree youth who stays with his friends in a room. He plays violin well and seeks every opportunity to help others, at the same time benefitting himself. His father is an assistant of an unsuccessful politician (Delhi Ganesh) who works for two politician brothers. Their sister, Seema (Pooja), has a crush on Jagan after he saves her from some goons. On the other hand, is Jamuna (Amogha). Jamuna is a very beautiful young woman who is from Kolkata. Her father is very protective of her. Jagan spots her at a book store and falls for her instantly only to be beaten up by her father shortly afterwards. Jamuna apologises to Jagan. Jagan, unable to forget her, goes to the bookstore again in hopes of seeing her. Jamuna buys a book, kisses it and starts writing her name, only to be interrupted by Jagan. Jagan only knows her name starts with J. They have a cup of coffee and Jagan shares his interest in marrying her. Jamuna, who deeply believes in destiny, writes her name and address in a 100rs bill and tells Jagan that if either of them get hold of the bill by 1 year, she would marry him. She than pays the waiter. When Jagan goes to the waiter to take back the bill, it is given away. Jamuna goes back to Kolkata and Jagan is lost. Jagan starts looking for the bill and his friends help him. Jamuna, who is in Kolkata get a proposal from her family friend, Guna(Shasikumar). She remembers Jagan's proposal and realizes she has fallen in love with him. She also looks for the bill with the help of her cousin, Meera (Malavika Avinash).

Under spam circumstances, Jagan gets engaged to Seema who later realizes the truth about Jagan look in for Jamuna. Jamuna gets hold of the bill while eating Pani Puri but the money is snatched by a petty thief. She breaks down and upon seeing this, Meera scolds her of abandoning Jagan in Chennai.

Seema gets hold of the book bought by Jamuna, who purposely leaves it at the cafe where they both met, in hopes it might reach Jagan. Seema gives it to Jagan who finds that Jamuna is from Bengal after seeing Bengali words in it. Jagan goes to Kolkata and Jamuna goes to Chennai with Meera, to confess to Jagan. Their trains cross each other at Vizag yet, they fail to meet. When in Kolkata, Jagan fails to find Jamuna. In Chennai, Jamuna finds Jagan's house. It is revealed that Meera is Jagan's friend as Jagan's sister and Meera share the same hostel. When Jamuna is left alone in Jagan's home, his father introduces another boy as Jagan. Jamuna leaves for Kolkata disappointed. After she leaves, the boy tells Meera the truth. She quickly informs Jamuna. But when she meets Jagan's father, his father tells her that he lied, fearing Jagan's life under the hands of the politician brothers.

Meera goes to Kolkata and tells Jamuna, who breaks down. In Chennai, Jagan finds the note. He happily tells Seema and her brothers oppose it. Meera and Jamuna comes to Chennai, and Guna sacrifices his love. Jagan learns that Jamuna is coming to Chennai. Seema's elder brother confronts him but her second elder brother happily wishes Jagan.

Jamuna and Jagan meet at the coffee shop again and unite.

Cast

R. Madhavan as Jagan
Amogha as Jamuna
Pooja as Seema
Delhi Ganesh as Jagan's father
Kalabhavan Mani as KTM, Jagan's friend
Ramji as Guru
Thalaivasal Vijay as Jamuna's father
Malavika Avinash as Meera, Jamuna's sister
Ceylon Manohar as Parasuram, Seema's Elder Brother
Adithya Menon as Sivaram, Seema's Second Elder brother
Manobala as Moorthy, Jamuna's family friend
Charle as MLA Sattamuthu, Politician
Dhamu as Oosi
Sashikumar as Guna, Moorthy's Brother
Thennavan as Karuppatti, Parasuram's Henchman
Balu Anand as Hostel Warden
 George Maryan
Sundar Raj
Giri
Reemma Sen as item number
Suchitra as herself

Production
In late 2000, producer Ravichandran signed on Saran to make a film titled J!J! with Vijay in dual lead roles as the characters Jaishankar and Jesudas. The team were also ready to approach Aishwarya Rai to play the lead role, before the venture was shelved and the producer and director moved on to make a different film with the same title. R. Madhavan was signed on and the film was later titled Jay Jay, after the two lead characters Jagan and Jamuna. The film was said to feature Mandira Bedi in the lead role, though she was later left out due to unknown reasons. Then Saran wanted to cast Simran for the role as they worked together before. But her unavailability led him to find another actress for the cast. Priyanka Kothari made her debut in the film under the stage name of Amogha, while the film also marked the debut of another heroine, Pooja, who had already signed up to feature in Jeeva's Ullam Ketkumae at the time. Thappu Thaalangal Sundar raj, a popular Kannada actor, returned to the Tamil screen after a gap of 15 years, while Ceylon Manohar also too returned to acting after 23 years and played the main villain. Malavika Avinash of Anni fame and Giri from the Sahana serial also made their entry into the big screen, with Giri playing the role of Madhavan's friend. Bengali actress Sharmila Ghosh was also in the cast. Reemma Sen, shot at the Visakhapatnam Railway Station with 40 models from Mumbai for a song in the film. The song was the first venture of Suchitra as a playback singer. Two further songs were picturised in Greece, with the team conducting shoots in the island of Milos and at Santornini. A week's shoot was also heldat the Institute for the Dumb and Deaf at Ramavaram, while multiple locations in Kolkata were chosen to depict a sequence in the city.

Release
The film opened to mixed reviews, with a critic form The Hindu noting "Saran seems to have been carried away by the protracted route of the 100-rupee note and the hide and seek game between the lovers that he lets his screenplay go haywire". Another reviewer noted "The movie also reminds of Kadhal Kottai at many instances but Jay Jay has not made itself as poignant as this movie. The costumes and the music are the only consolation for the producer of this boring and fruitless movie". A critic from Deccan Herald wrote that "Music, songs and Madhavan’s performance are the highlights of the movie".

Despite the mixed reviews, the film ran for seventy five days across Chennai. The film was later dubbed and released under the same name in Telugu by producers Seetharam Reddy and Hema Babu.

Soundtrack

The soundtrack was composed by Bharadwaj, with lyrics by Vairamuthu.

References

External links

2003 films
Films shot in Kolkata
Films shot in Andhra Pradesh
2003 romantic comedy films
2000s Tamil-language films
Films directed by Saran
Films scored by Bharadwaj (composer)
Indian romantic comedy films
Films shot in Chennai
Films shot in Greece
Films shot in Santorini